Events from the year 1890 in Canada.

Incumbents

Crown 
 Monarch – Victoria

Federal government 
 Governor General – Frederick Stanley 
 Prime Minister – John A. Macdonald
 Chief Justice – William Johnstone Ritchie (New Brunswick)
 Parliament – 6th

Provincial governments

Lieutenant governors 
Lieutenant Governor of British Columbia – Hugh Nelson  
Lieutenant Governor of Manitoba – John Christian Schultz 
Lieutenant Governor of New Brunswick – Samuel Leonard Tilley  
Lieutenant Governor of Nova Scotia – Archibald McLelan (until June 26) then Malachy Bowes Daly (from July 11)
Lieutenant Governor of Ontario – Alexander Campbell  
Lieutenant Governor of Prince Edward Island – Jedediah Slason Carvell 
Lieutenant Governor of Quebec – Auguste-Réal Angers

Premiers    
Premier of British Columbia – John Robson 
Premier of Manitoba – Thomas Greenway 
Premier of New Brunswick – Andrew George Blair  
Premier of Nova Scotia – William Stevens Fielding  
Premier of Ontario – Oliver Mowat    
Premier of Prince Edward Island – Neil McLeod 
Premier of Quebec – Honoré Mercier

Territorial governments

Lieutenant governors 
 Lieutenant Governor of Keewatin – John Christian Schultz
 Lieutenant Governor of the North-West Territories – Joseph Royal

Premiers 
 Chairman of the Lieutenant-Governor's Advisory Council of the North-West Territories – Robert Brett

Events
March 31 — Manitoba Liberals under Thomas Greenway halt public funding of Catholic schools; causes uproar in Quebec.
June 5 — Ontario election: Sir Oliver Mowat's Liberals win a sixth consecutive majority.
July 20 — British Columbia election
August 10 — Prince Edward Island election

Births

January to June

April 20 — Maurice Duplessis, politician and 16th Premier of Quebec (d.1959)
March 3 — Norman Bethune, physician and medical innovator (d.1939)
March 21 — Norman Hipel, politician and Minister (d.1953)
March 24 — Agnes Macphail, politician, first woman to be elected to the House of Commons of Canada (d.1954)
March 27 — John Horne Blackmore, politician (d.1971)
May 4 — Franklin Carmichael, painter and Group of Seven member (d.1945)
May 17 — Lionel FitzGerald, artist
May 30 — John Stuart Foster, physicist (d.1944)

July to December
July 27 — Ian Alistair Mackenzie, politician and Minister (d.1949)
August 10 — Angus Lewis Macdonald, lawyer, law professor, politician and 19th Premier of Nova Scotia (d.1954)
September 20 — Kathleen Parlow, violinist (d.1963)
October 9 — Aimee Semple McPherson, evangelist (d.1944)
October 28 — Louis Orville Breithaupt, 18th Lieutenant Governor of Ontario (d.1960)
December 10 — Byron Ingemar Johnson, politician and 24th Premier of British Columbia (d.1964)

Deaths

January 1 — Joseph Godéric Blanchet, politician (b.1829)
January 17 — François-Xavier-Anselme Trudel, politician (b.1838)
January 25 – William Kennedy, explorer involved in the search for Sir John Franklin  (b.1814)
February 13 — Éphrem-A. Brisebois, police officer (b. 1850)
April 4 — Pierre-Joseph-Olivier Chauveau, Premier of Quebec (b.1820)
April 25 — Crowfoot, a chief of the Siksika First Nation (b. c1830)
September 26 — Henri Faraud, bishop of the Roman Catholic Church (b.1823)
December — Silas Tertius Rand Bill, politician, merchant and shipowner (b.1842)

Historical Documents
Editorial tries to convince eastern Canadians to go west instead of south

British Methodist Episcopal bishop steals hearts of Canadian Methodist conference participants (Note: racial stereotypes)

Australians advised to avoid Canada's example of "disunion" as they consider federation

British socialist newspaper decries "that venerable fraud and child kidnapper, Doctor Barnardo" shipping boys to Canada

Victoria, B.C. Free Public Library has popular novels of Scott, Dickens, Trollope and Thackeray, and also Bulwer, Yonge, Braddon and Ouida

Montreal impresaria brings Metropolitan Opera orchestra (featuring Victor Herbert) to play symphonic favourites

Long neglected, foxglove (Digitalis purpurea) is coming back into favour in gardens

References
  

 
Years of the 19th century in Canada
Canada
1890 in North America